Janet Bewley (born November 10, 1951) is an American politician and former Democratic minority leader in the Wisconsin State Senate. She was a member of the Wisconsin Senate from 2015 through 2023, and previously served four years in the Wisconsin State Assembly, representing Iron, Ashland, Bayfield, and Price counties in the northwest of the state.

Biography

Born in Cleveland, Ohio, Bewley graduated from Cleveland's James Ford Rhodes High School in 1969, and earned her B.A. from Case Western Reserve University. She was the first member of her family to graduate from college, and went on to earn a Master's in Academic Administration from the University of Maine in 1977. She was elected to the Wisconsin State Assembly in 2010, replacing Gary Sherman (who did not seek re-election). Before being elected to the Assembly, she served on the city council of Ashland. She is a former community relations officer for the Wisconsin Housing and Economic Development Authority.

On December 16, 2013 Bewley announced her intention to run for the Wisconsin Senate, District 25, to replace retiring Senator Robert Jauch, also a Democrat. She won the primary election with 72% of the vote, and was opposed by Republican Dane Deutsch (Jauch's 2010 opponent) in the November general election. Her old seat was contested by Democrat Beth Meyers and Republican Jamey Francis in the November 2014 general election. On November 4, 2014, Bewley was elected to the Wisconsin State Senate, and Meyers was elected to Bewley's old Assembly seat.

On April 24, 2020, the Wisconsin Senate Democratic Caucus chose Bewley as their new leader after the resignation of Senator Jennifer Shilling from that role.

On July 22, 2022, Bewley was involved in a fatal car crash. She drove her car out of a public beach to turn east onto U.S. Highway 2. Her car was struck by a vehicle driven by 27-year-old Alyssa Ortman which was driving west at roughly 100 mph. Ortman's car was forced across the highway and hit a third car that was traveling east. Both Ortman and her five-year-old daughter were killed in the crash. An electronic cigarette containing Delta-8-THC was found in Ortman's possession. Bewley was talking on the phone with a reporter from the Milwaukee Journal Sentinel at the time of the crash, and had had eye surgery the day before.

Bewley did not run for re-election in 2022.

References

External links

 Profile at the Wisconsin Senate
 Senate directory page from 2019
 
 
 Campaign website
 

|-

1951 births
21st-century American politicians
21st-century American women politicians
Case Western Reserve University alumni
Democratic Party members of the Wisconsin State Assembly
Democratic Party Wisconsin state senators
Living people
People from Ashland, Wisconsin
Politicians from Cleveland
University of Maine alumni
Women state legislators in Wisconsin